Fastweb is an online service to help students pay for college through scholarships, financial aid, part-time job search, and private student loan options.

History
Founded by Larry Organ in 1995, Fastweb is an acronym for "financial aid search through the web". In 1999, Mark Kantrowitz, who created the financial aid website FinAid.org, began working with Organ to develop a site that provided financial aid advice to users as well.

In 2001, Monster Worldwide, which also owns other websites such as Military.com, announced it had acquired Fastweb.
Monster was acquired in 2016 by Randstad Holding.

Reception
Though sometimes touted among lists of scholarship search tools, Fastweb has received mixed to negative reviews from NAAS Consumer News and from multiple other reviewers, such as CBS News MoneyWatch for showing students many ads while using the website, and generating "zero promising matches for users".

References

External links
FastWeb official web site

Canadian educational websites
Monster.com